Şemsettin of Karaman (died 1352) was a bey of the Karaman Beylik, a Turkish beylik in Anatolia in the 14th century.
 
His father was İbrahim Bey. He succeeded his brother Ahmet Bey in 1350. However, his reign was short, and it is believed he was poisoned by one of his brothers in 1352.

References

Karamanids
1352 deaths
Year of birth unknown
Turkic rulers
14th-century monarchs in Asia
Ethnic Afshar people